Javin France (born February 23, 1993), professionally known as JayFrance, is an American hip-hop, R&B producer, and Public Figure from St. Louis, Missouri. He has produced for artists such as Wiz Khalifa, TrackBoyz, Schoolboy Q, Juicy J,  Flo Rida,  The Audibles, Fetty Wap among others. He was nominated for a grammy for best rap album for Wiz Khalifa's 5th studio album titled Blacc Hollywood.

Music career
JayFrance first started experimenting with music as a student at Hazelwood West High School. His first major production hit came with Atlantic recording artist Fetty Wap's “My Way” in 2015. It also featured rapper Drake on the remix. The song reached #7 on the Billboard Hot 100 and attained the widespread attention for the first time. Following its release to digital retailers, “My Way” jumped 80 positions from 87 to number 7, fueled by 152,000 first-week sales and 6.6 million domestic streams.

Discography

Singles

Awards and nominations

References

External links
JayFrance on Instagram
JayFrance on Twitter
JayFrance on Facebook
JayFrance on Spotify
JayFrance on YouTube
JayFrance on Telegram

1993 births
Living people
American hip hop record producers
Musicians from St. Louis
African-American businesspeople
African-American record producers
Businesspeople from St. Louis
21st-century African-American people